Menetou-Couture is a commune in the Cher department in the Centre-Val de Loire region of France.

Geography

Population

Sights

Historic sites
 The church of St. Caprais, dating from the twelfth century
 The fifteenth-century chateau of Menetou-Couture.
 The ruins of the 12th-century abbey of Notre-Dame at Fontmorigny.

See also
Communes of the Cher department

References

Communes of Cher (department)